Throughout the history of the People's Republic of China, the position that effectively reigned as the Commander-in-Chief of the Armed Forces changed from time to time. During some periods, it was not exactly clear who was the supreme commander of the People's Liberation Army. Recently, Chairman of the Central Military Commission serves as the Commander-in-chief of the People's Liberation Army. The officeholder is usually the General Secretary of the Chinese Communist Party (CCP) as well as the paramount leader.

From 1954 to 1968, the ex officio commander-in-chief was the Chairman of the People's Republic of China (head of state), in his capacity as Chairman of the National Defence Council. However, a similar command structure inside the CCP known as the Party Central Military Commission, whose chairman was the de facto Commander-in-Chief of the Armed Forces. The Chairman of the Central Military Commission, Mao Zedong, who the Chairman of the Chinese Communist Party served as the paramount leader. Chairman of the National Defence Council included Liu Shaoqi, who from 1959 to 1968, was PRC's president. Even though the President was the de jure supreme commander of the military, it nonetheless was a subordinate of the CMC Chairman.

From 1975 to 1982, the head of the military was the Chairman of the CCP. This gave constitutional power to leader of the Chinese Communist Party.

From 1982 onwards, the Commander-in-Chief was the Chairman of the Central Military Commission. This position, however did not always give the person entitled the top command as was the case with Chairman Hua Guofeng. Deng Xiaoping was able to effectively control the military as Vice Chairman of the Central Military Commission and the Chief of Staff of the PLA from 1978 to 1981.

References

See also 

 Politics of China

Military of the People's Republic of China
Politics of China
Commanders in chief